Paionia is a municipality in the Kilkis regional unit of Central Macedonia, Greece. The seat of the municipality is the town Polykastro. The municipality is named after the ancient region of Paeonia. It has an area of 919.276 km2.

Municipality
The municipality Paionia was formed at the 2011 local government reform by the merger of the following 5 former municipalities, that became municipal units:
Axioupoli
Evropos
Goumenissa
Livadia
Polykastro

Province
The province of Paionia was one of the provinces of the Kilkis Prefecture. Its territory corresponded with that of the current municipality Paionia, except the municipal unit Polykastro. It was abolished in 2006.

References

Municipalities of Central Macedonia
Provinces of Greece
Populated places in Kilkis (regional unit)